Typhina claydoni is a species of sea snail, a marine gastropod mollusk in the family Muricidae, the murex snails or rock snails.

Description

Distribution
This marine species occurs off Western Australia.

References

 Houart, R, Buge, B. & Zuccon, D. (2021). A taxonomic update of the Typhinae (Gastropoda: Muricidae) with a review of New Caledonia species and the description of new species from New Caledonia, the South China Sea and Western Australia. Journal of Conchology. 44(2): 103–147.

External links
 Houart, R. (1988). Typhisopsis claydoni n. sp., a new species of Typhinae (Gastropoda: Muricidae) from Western Australia. Publicações Ocasionais da Sociedade Portuguesa de Malacologia. 11: 39–40

claydoni
Gastropods described in 1988